Femmes algériennes pour un changement vers l'égalité (Algerian women for a change towards equality) or FACE is a women's organisation created during the 2019 Algerian "Hirak" protests and credited with the invention of the "feminist square", a part of the Friday Hirak protests held in front of Algiers 1 University.

Creation
The declaration called for full equality between female and male citizens, announced "the creation of a feminist square which will take place every Friday in front of the main entrance of Algiers 1 University starting from 13:00" and called for equal representation of women in any citizens' projects aimed to resolve the aims of the Hirak protests.

Actions

Feminist square
FACE describes the feminist square as enabling women to group together in a way that overcomes ordinary practical difficulties in meeting up while remaining active in the Hirak protests. The feminist squares aim to be static for one hour and then to start moving with the main march.

The first feminist square took place on Friday 22 March.

The second took place on 29 March 2019, starting with the placing of banners. The female participants were verbally and physically assaulted and their banners were torn by protestors who stated that "it's not the right time", that the women "were splitting the movement" and that equality is against Islam. Other protestors protected the feminist square women. Police asked the women to leave. According to Le Figaro, the attack "damaged the image of a protest movement known for its pacifism and openness, especially for women".

Amina Izarouken, a member of FACE responded to the demand to keep quiet by saying that "democracy will be made including women, with complete equality, or it won't be made".

The feminist square became a regular component of the Hirak demonstrations. In the 1 November 2019 Hirak demonstration, one of the largest, feminist square protestors carried portraits of former female fighters.

Creation of MNFA

Appeals
On 16 December 2019, following the election of Abdelmadjid Tebboune in the 12 December third attempted presidential election, FACE and the feminist square declared that "Tebboune is not and never will be our president", denounced police repression, called for imprisoned protestors to be released and demanded that street protests, debates and political meetings of Hirak continue.

References

Feminist organisations in Algeria
2019–2021 Algerian protests